Clepsis aba is a species of moth of the family Tortricidae. It was first described by Józef Razowski in 1979. It is found in Shaanxi, China.

The length of the forewings is 11–12 mm.

References

Clepsis
Moths described in 1979
Taxa named by Józef Razowski
Moths of Asia